The 1921 Kalamazoo football team represented Kalamazoo College during the 1921 college football season.  In Ralph H. Young's fifth year as head coach, Kalamazoo compiled a 7–2 record, and outscored their opponents 234 to 104.

Schedule

References

Kalamazoo
Kalamazoo Hornets football seasons
Kalamazoo fotball